Osbornes Mills is an unincorporated community in Roane County, in the U.S. state of West Virginia.

History
A post office called Osbornes Mills was established in 1855, and remained in operation until 1935. The community was named after Archibald Osborne, the proprietor of a local mill.

References

Unincorporated communities in Roane County, West Virginia
Unincorporated communities in West Virginia